Dison is a municipality of Wallonia located in the province of Liège, Belgium. 

On January 1, 2006, Dison had a total population of 14,243. The total area is 14.01 km² which gives a population density of 1,017 inhabitants per km².

The municipality consists of the following districts: Andrimont and  Dison.

References

External links
 

Municipalities of Liège Province